Vaughn Scott (born 11 January 1990, Cape Town) is a male Taekwondo fighter who represented New Zealand at the 2012 Summer Olympics in London in the Men's 80kg weight class. He lost his first round fight to Argentine Sebastián Crismanich by a score of 9–5. Because Crismanich went on to win the gold medal, Scott was included in the repechage and lost his fight to Afghan Nesar Ahmad Bahave by a score of 11–6, and was eliminated from the Olympic tournament.

In competition to qualify for the 2016 Olympics, Scott lost to Hayder Shkara, the same fighter he defeated to qualify for the 2012 games.

References

1990 births
Living people
New Zealand male taekwondo practitioners
Taekwondo practitioners at the 2012 Summer Olympics
Olympic taekwondo practitioners of New Zealand
People from Cape Town